Mae Valley is the self-titled debut EP released by New Zealand country music duo Mae Valley. It was produced by Sam de Jong and released by Sony Music Entertainment New Zealand. The music video for "Brightside" was directed by Shae Sterling and debuted in February 2016.

Track listing

Personnel 

 Alister Wood - piano on "Hurricane", "I Won't Be Long" & "Glitter"
 Benny Tipene - acoustic guitar on "Brightside"
 Daniel Cosgrove - acoustic and electric guitars on "Hurricane", "I Won't Be Long" & "Glitter"
 Dave Baxter - banjo on "Brightside"
 Djeisan Suskov - mixing on "Brightside"
 Rhys Machell - bass on "Hurricane" & "Home"
 Sam de Jong - drums, synths, mixing, acoustic guitar on "Glitter"
Produced and Engineered by Sam de Jong
Recorded at Parachute Studios
Mastered by Leon Zervos at Studios 301, Sydney

Charts

References

2016 EPs
Mae Valley (band) albums
Albums produced by Sam de Jong